Adolf Reichwein (3 October 1898 – 20 October 1944) was a German educator, economist, and cultural policymaker for the SPD, who resisted the policies of Nazi Germany.

Biography
Reichwein was born in Bad Ems. He took part in the First World War, in which he was seriously wounded in the lung. Reichwein studied at the universities of Frankfurt am Main und Marburg, under Hugo Sinzheimer and Franz Oppenheimer, among others. In the 1920s, he was active in education policy and adult education in Berlin and Thuringia. It was he who founded the Volkshochschule ("People's High School" - e.g., Community College) and the Arbeiterbildungsheim ("Workers' Training Home") in Jena and ran them until 1929. In his Hungermarsch nach Lappland ("Hunger March to Lappland") he described in diary form a punishing hike with some young jobless people in the far north. In 1929–1930, he worked as an adviser to the Prussian Culture Minister Carl Heinrich Becker.

From 1930 until 1933, he was a professor at the newly founded Pedagogical Academy in Halle. After the Nazis seized power, he was let go for political reasons and sent off to Tiefensee in Brandenburg to become an elementary schoolteacher. There, until 1939, he conducted many instructional experiments, which received a lot of attention, with educational progressivism and especially vocational education in mind. Reichwein described in his work Schaffendes Schulvolk ("Productive School People") his instructional concept, inspired by the Wandervogel movement and labour-school pedagogy, whose main focus was on trips, activity-oriented instruction with school gardens, and projects spanning age groups. For Sachunterricht (~field education, or practical learning) and its history, he included important historical documents. Reichwein split the instructional content into a summer cycle (natural sciences and social studies) and a winter cycle ("Man as former"/"in his territory"). From 1939, Reichwein was working at the Folklore Museum in Berlin as a museum educator.

As a member of the Kreisau Circle, Reichwein belonged to the resistance movement against Hitler. In early July 1944, Reichwein was arrested by the Gestapo, and, in a trial against Julius Leber, Hermann Maaß and Gustav Dahrendorf, sentenced to death by Roland Freisler's Volksgerichtshof. He was killed next to Maaß at Plötzensee Prison in Berlin on 20 October 1944.

Selected works 
 Schaffendes Schulvolk. Kohlhammer Verlag, Stuttgart/Berlin 1937.
 Film in der Landschule. Kohlhammer Verlag, Stuttgart/Berlin 1938.
 (New annotated edition of both works:) Schaffendes Schulvolk – Film in der Schule. Die Tiefenseer Schulschriften. pub. by. Wolfgang Klafki et al.. Beltz, Weinheim/Basel 1993.

Literature 
 Ullrich Amlung:
"... in der Entscheidung gibt es keine Umwege": Adolf Reichwein 1898 - 1944. Reformpädagoge, Sozialist, Widerstandskämpfer. 3. Auflage Schüren, Marburg 2003 
Adolf Reichwein: 1898–1944. Ein Lebensbild des Reformpädagogen, Volkskundlers und Widerstandskämpfers. 2. Auflage dipa, Frankfurt am Main, 1999 
Adolf Reichwein 1898 - 1944. Eine Personalbibliographie.   Universität Marburg 1991 (Schriften der Universitätsbibliothek Marburg, 54) 
 Hartmut Mitzlaff: Adolf Reichweins (1898–1944) heimliche Reformpraxis in Tiefensee 1933-1939. In: Astrid Kaiser, Detlef Pech (Hrsg.): Geschichte und historische Konzeptionen des Sachunterrichts. Schneider-Verlag Hohengehren, Baltmannsweiler 2004, S. 143–150.

External links 
 
Adolf-Reichwein-Verein (New Webpage: reichwein-forum)
 Adolf-Reichwein-Archiv in the Bibliothek für Bildungsgeschichtliche Forschung

1898 births
1944 deaths
People from Rhein-Lahn-Kreis
Heads of schools in Germany
German economists
German military personnel of World War I
People from Rhineland-Palatinate executed at Plötzensee Prison
People from Hesse-Nassau
University of Marburg alumni
Members of the Kreisau Circle
Executed members of the 20 July plot
Museum educators